The Crimean Mountains or Yayla Mountains are a range of mountains running parallel to the south-eastern coast of Crimea, between about  from the sea. Toward the west, the mountains drop steeply to the Black Sea, and to the east, they change slowly into a steppe landscape.

The Crimean Mountains consist of three subranges. The highest is the Main Range, which is subdivided into several yaylas or mountain plateaus (yayla or yaylak is Turkic for "alpine meadow"). They are:

 Baydar yayla
 Ai-Petri yayla
 Yalta yayla
 Nikita yayla
 Hurzuf yayla
 Babugan yayla
 Chatyr-Dag yayla
 Dologorukovskaya (Subatkan) yayla
 Demirci yayla
 Qarabiy yayla

Highest peaks

Other important peaks over 1,200 metres include:

 Demir-Kapu 1,540 m in the Babugan Yayla;
 Zeytin-Kosh 1,537 m in the Babugan Yayla; 
 Kemal-Egerek 1,529 m in the Babugan Yayla;
 Eklizi-Burun 1,527 m in the Chatyrdag Yayla;
 Lapata 1,406 m in the Yaltynska Yayla, Yalta Yaylası;
 Northern Demirji 1,356 m in the Demirci Yayla;
 Ai-Petri 1,234 m in the Ay Petri Yaylası.

Passes and rivers

The passes over the Crimean Mountains are:

 Angarskyi Pass (752m) near Perevalne, on a road from Alushta to Simferopol
 Baydar Gate (503m) near Foros, connecting Baydar Valley and the sea coast
 Laspi Pass (350m) near Cape Aya, on a road from Yalta to Sevastopol.

Rivers of the Crimean Mountains include the Alma River, Chernaya River, and Salhir River on the northern slope and Uchan-su River on the southern slope which forms the Uchan-su waterfall, and the highest waterfall in Crimea.

History 
Archaeologists have found the earliest anatomically modern humans in Europe in the Crimean Mountains' Buran-Kaya caves. The fossils are 32,000 years old, with the artifacts linked to the Gravettian culture. The fossils have cut marks suggesting a post-mortem defleshing ritual.

Gallery

See also
 Crimea

References

External links

Crimean mountains - view on all parts of mountains of Crimea
Mountains of Crimea - Great collection of Crimean mountains from private mountain guide Sergey Sorokin

 
Landforms of Crimea
Mountain ranges of Ukraine